Marcel Răducanu (born 21 October 1954) is a Romanian former professional footballer who played as an attacking midfielder.

Club career

Marcel Răducanu was born in Bucharest on 21 October 1954. He grew up in the Pantelimon neighborhood and started to play organised football at the age of 7 at Progresul București, after which at the age of 9 and a half he moved at Steaua București's youth center where he was coached by Francisc Fabian. Răducanu made his Divizia A debut on 22 April 1973, playing for Steaua in a 2–0 loss against CSM Reșița. He won The Double in the 1975–76 season, contributing with 17 goals in 31 Divizia A matches. He won another title in the 1977–78 season for which he contributed with 18 goals in 31 matches and a cup in 1979 in which he scored two goals in the final which ended 3–0 against Sportul Studențesc București. Răducanu also played 11 matches in which he scored 5 goals in European competitions for Steaua and in the 6–0 victory against Young Boys from the 1979–80 European Cup Winners' Cup, Răducanu scored one of his most beautiful goals after showing his dribbling abilities in front of Young Boys's defense, the Swiss goalkeeper, Walter Eichenberger saying in an interview years later after that match:"He humiliated us and laughed at us". Răducanu has a total of 229 Divizia A appearances in which he scored 94 goals and in 1980 he was the Romanian Footballer of the Year, also in the same year he was nominated for the Ballon d'Or. In the summer of 1981 he defected following a match in Dortmund, West Germany. In his native Romania this act was considered a desertion, as he was a captain in the Army. Therefore, he was sentenced to nearly six years in prison in his absence. Once in West Germany he signed with both Hannover 96 and Borussia Dortmund clubs, and as a result was suspended by UEFA for one year. In order to have his services, Borussia Dortmund paid half a million deutschmarks to the Hannover club, and Răducanu made his debut in Bundesliga on 20 August 1982 under coach Karl-Heinz Feldkamp in a 1–1 against VfB Stuttgart. In his first season, Răducanu scored 9 goals in 26 matches, including two goals, one from a free kick and one after a series of dribbles in a 4–4 against Bayern Munich, these performances made sports magazine Kicker include him in the team of the 1982–83 Bundesliga season. Between 1982 and 1988, he played a total of 163 games in Bundesliga, scoring 31 goals and made 5 appearances in European competitions. In 1988 Răducanu signed a contract in Switzerland with FC Zürich where he played 47 matches, scoring 12 goals and won the promotion to the top league Nationalliga A via the playoffs with FC Zürich. In 2022, the German newspaper, Bild included Răducanu in Borussia Dortmund's best 50 players of all time, placing him on the 50th position. A book about him was written by George Coca Lob, called Marcel Răducanu. Talent, fenomen și legendă (Marcel Răducanu. Talent, phenomenon and legend).

International career
Marcel Răducanu played 18 games and scored 3 goals for Romania, making his debut on 13 May 1979 when coach Florin Halagian sent him on the field in the 65th minute in order to replace Constantin Stan in a 1–1 against Cyprus at the Euro 1980 qualifiers. He played another two games at the Euro 1980 qualifiers scoring a goal in each of them, a 2–1 loss against Yugoslavia and a 2–0 victory in the second leg against Cyprus. He played both games of the 1977–80 Balkan Cup final which was won with 4–3 on aggregate against Yugoslavia. Marcel Răducanu played four games at the 1982 World Cup qualifiers, including a 2–1 victory against England in which he opened the score.

International goals
Scores and results list Romania's goal tally first, score column indicates score after each Răducanu goal.

Coaching career
Marcel Răducanu coached Türkgücü München in the 1992–93 Landesliga Bayern-Süd season. Since 1994, he has run a football school in Dortmund and Mario Götze trained at his academy when he was 10 years old.

Personal life
His uncle, Marin Voinea was also a footballer.

Honours

Club
Steaua București
Divizia A: 1975–76, 1977–78
Cupa României: 1975–76, 1978–79
Romania
Balkan Cup: 1977–80

Individual
Romanian Footballer of the Year: 1980
Ballon d'Or: 1980 (27th place)

Notes

References

1954 births
Living people
Footballers from Bucharest
Romanian footballers
Olympic footballers of Romania
Romania international footballers
Romanian expatriate footballers
FC Steaua București players
Borussia Dortmund players
FC Zürich players
Romanian expatriate sportspeople in West Germany
Expatriate footballers in West Germany
Romanian defectors
Expatriate footballers in Switzerland
Liga I players
Bundesliga players
Association football midfielders
Romanian football managers
Expatriate football managers in Germany